Radio Maglaj is a Bosnian local commercial radio station, broadcasting from Maglaj, Bosnia and Herzegovina. This radio station broadcasts a variety of programs such music and local news. Local television channel, TV Maglaj is also part of company (RTV Maglaj d.o.o. Maglaj).

Program is mainly produced in Bosnian language at one FM frequency (Maglaj ) and it is available in the city of Maglaj as well as in nearby municipalities in Zenica-Doboj Canton and Tuzla Canton area. Radio station mainly broadcasts folk and popular music, with informative and entertaining talk shows.

Estimated number of listeners of Radio Maglaj is around 23.225.

History
Radio Maglaj was founded on 9 May 1971 as local/municipal Radio Sarajevo network affiliate, from 1971 until 1992, when war in Bosnia and Herzegovina started. During the war, with the establishment of the new national public service broadcaster RTVBiH - Radio BiH (now BHRT - BH Radio 1) radio stations from the former Radio Sarajevo 2 local network generally continued to operate as local public radio stations under the jurisdiction of local authorities in Bosnia and Herzegovina (municipalities, cantons).

During the Siege of Maglaj, Radio Maglaj constantly broadcast a program, "Fenix" Televizija (Television), in addition to informing, also had the role of documenting archival material, and Maglajske novine (Maglaj newspapers) also began to appear.

In 2000, Radio Maglaj was re-registered in Communications Regulatory Agency of Bosnia and Herzegovina as private, commercial radio station.

Frequencies
 Maglaj

See also 
 List of radio stations in Bosnia and Herzegovina
 Antena Radio Jelah
 Radio Zos
 Radio Zenica
 Radio Tuzla
 Radio Tešanj

References

External links 
 Facebook page of RTV Maglaj
 www.radiostanica.ba
 www.fmscan.org
 Communications Regulatory Agency of Bosnia and Herzegovina
Mass media in Maglaj
Maglaj
Radio stations established in 1971